Bistolida owenii is a species of sea snail, a cowry, a marine gastropod mollusc in the family Cypraeidae, the cowries.

Subspecies
Bistolida owenii owenii (Sowerby, 1837)  (synonym : Bistolida menkeana Deshayes, G.P., 1863 )
 forma : Bistolida owenii owenii modesta (f) (Sowerby, 1870)
Bistolida owenii piae  Lorenz, F. Jr. & M. Chiapponi, 2005 
Bistolida owenii vasta (Schilder, F.A. & M. Schilder, 1938)  (synonym : Cypraea pulchella Gray, J.E., 1828)

Description

Distribution
This species is found in the seas around the Comoros, Kenya, Madagascar, the Mascarene Basin, Mauritius; Reunion, the Seychelles, Tanzania and Transkei.

References

 Verdcourt, B. (1954). The cowries of the East African Coast (Kenya, Tanganyika, Zanzibar and Pemba). Journal of the East Africa Natural History Society 22(4) 96: 129-144, 17 pls.
 Burgess, C.M. (1970). The Living Cowries. AS Barnes and Co, Ltd. Cranbury, New Jersey
 Steyn, D.G. & Lussi, M. (1998) Marine Shells of South Africa. An Illustrated Collector’s Guide to Beached Shells. Ekogilde Publishers, Hartebeespoort, South Africa, ii + 264 pp. page(s): 66 
 Lorenz F. & Chiapponi M. (2005) Revision of the Bistolida owenii-complex (Gastropoda: Cypraeidae) with the description of a new subspecies. Visaya 1(5): 22–36.

Cypraeidae
Gastropods described in 1837